Mbanza, or M'banza, may refer to:

Places
Angola
M'banza-Kongo, a city in Zaire Province
Mbanza-Soyo (officially Soyo), a city in Zaire Province
Mbanza (territory), a historical region of the Kingdom of Kongo

DR Congo
Mbanza-Ngungu, a city in Bas-Congo Province
Mbanza (village), a village in Bas-Congo Province

Other
Mbanza (ethnic group), an ethnic group of Central Africa
Mbanza language, a Ubangian language spoken in Central Africa
Mbanza Congo Airport, an airport in M'banza Kongo, Angola